Estadio Internacional is a multi-purpose stadium in Malabo, Equatorial Guinea.  It is currently used mostly for football matches.  The stadium holds 6,000.

Football venues in Equatorial Guinea
Buildings and structures in Malabo
Multi-purpose stadiums in Equatorial Guinea